A gubernatorial election was held on 25 June 1972 to elect the Governor of , the prefecture is the southernmost and westernmost prefecture of Japan.

This is the first election since the return of the prefecture to Japanese control. Previously the island was administered by the United States Civil Administration of the Ryukyu Islands.

Candidates 
Chōbyō Yara, 69, incumbent since 1968, endorsed by the union of the left (Progress and Unity), including the OSMP, JSP and JCP.  
Seisaku Ota, 68, backed by LDP.

Results

References 

1972 elections in Japan
Okinawa gubernatorial elections